Katawar is a village in the Hadoti region of Rajasthan, India. It serves as a Gram panchayat for six nearby villages which are Manyagan, Achrawa, Bhojukheri, Mehla, Baldevpura. Bichhalas. The nearest town is Atru, which is 22 km away. It is located 52 km from the district headquarter, Baran.

Social structure 
As per available data from the year 2009, 2049 persons live in 367 house holds in the village Katawar. There are 971 female individuals and 1078 male individuals in the village. Females constitute 47.39% and males constitute 52.61% of the total population.

There are 822 scheduled castes persons of which 388 are females and 434 are males. Females constitute 47.2% and males constitute 52.8% of the scheduled castes population. Scheduled castes constitute 40.12% of the total population.

There are 71 scheduled tribes persons of which 34 are females and 37 are males. Females constitute 47.89% and males constitute 52.11% of the scheduled tribes population. Scheduled tribes constitute 3.47% of the total population.

Population density of Katawar is 236.33 persons per square kilometer.

Land and natural resources in Katawar 
Maps, reports and datasets of Katawar on topography, land use land cover(LULC), watershed / hydrological parameters etc. are available as a professional paid service. Please contact us for further details.

Total area of Katawar is 867 Hectares as per the data available for the year 2009.

Total sown/agricultural area is 758 ha. About 86.99 ha is un-irrigated area. About 671.01 ha is irrigated area. About 671.01 ha is irrigated by canal water.

About 73 ha is in non-agricultural use. About 4 ha is used permanent pastures and grazing lands.

About 2 ha is culturable waste land. About 3 ha is lying as fallow land other than current fallows. About 23 ha is covered by barren and un-cultivable land.

Population 
Katawar is a village in Atru Tehsil, Baran district of Rajasthan state in India. Katawar population in 2022 is estimated to be 2,295. According to 2011 census population is 2,008.The Katawar Village located in Atru Tehsil, 2049 People are living in this Village, 1078 are males and 971 are females as per 2011 census. Expected Katawar population 2021/2022 is between 2,008 and 2,295. Literate people are 1282 out of 824 are male and 458 are female. People living in Katawar depend on multiple skills, total workers are 1042 out of which men are 565 and women are 477. Total 446 Cultivators are depended on agriculture farming out of 217 are cultivated by men and 229 are women. 215 people works in agricultural land as a labour in Katawar, men are 152 and 63 are women.

Katawar population in 2021/2022 is between 2,008 and 2,295 and total households residing are 367.

Education 
There is one Govt. Senior Secondary School in Katawar. Where Science-Biology, and Arts (Hindi Lit, Pol.Science, Geography) subject are offered. The quality of education is very good. In this school there is 360+ students enrolled. There is a private school in katawar, which name is Sarswati Secondary School Katawar. Almost every child attends school.

Health care 
There is a primary health centre (PHC) in katawar, there basic health facilities are available.

Transport 
Katawar is well connected with its nearby town, villages and cities through roads. Atru - Khanpur road go through katawar village.

References 

villages in Atru Tehsil
Villages in Baran district
Gram Panchayats and Villages in Atru Tehsil